Catherine Jamison (born March 26, 1950) is an American former competition swimmer.

Jamison was born in Portland, Oregon.  She trained with the Santa Clara Swim Club in Santa Clara, California, under coach George Haines who was noted for producing Olympic swimmers during the 1960s and 1970s.

Jamison represented the United States as an 18-year-old at the 1968 Summer Olympics in Mexico City.  She competed in the women's 200-meter breaststroke, and finished fifth overall in the event final with a time of 2:48.4.

References

1950 births
Living people
American female breaststroke swimmers
Olympic swimmers of the United States
Santa Clara Broncos athletes
Swimmers from Portland, Oregon
Swimmers at the 1968 Summer Olympics
20th-century American women